Valley Junction may refer to:
Valley Junction, Oregon, an unincorporated community in Polk County, Oregon
Valley Junction, Texas, an unincorporated community in Robertson County, Texas
Valley Junction, Wisconsin, an unincorporated community in Monroe County, Wisconsin
West Des Moines, Iowa, a city known as "Valley Junction" from 1893–1938